Andrew Ramsey (1877–1908) was a Scottish footballer who played in the Football League for Middlesbrough.

References

1877 births
1908 deaths
Scottish footballers
English Football League players
Association football defenders
Middlesbrough F.C. players
Leyton F.C. players